Robert Ridgway (1850–1929) was an ornithologist.

Robert Ridgway or Ridgeway may also refer to:
Robert Ridgway (congressman) (1823–1870), Virginia congressman, lawyer and editor
Robert Ridgway (engineer) (1862–1938), American civil engineer
Robert Ridgeway, 2nd Earl of Londonderry (died 1641)

See also
Ridgway (disambiguation)